Perth is a town in Fulton County, New York, United States. The population was 3,646 at the 2010 census. It is in the southeastern corner of the county, north of Amsterdam. The town is named after Perth, Scotland.

History

The land was first settled circa 1772 by pioneers from Scotland. The town of Perth was formed from part of the town of Amsterdam in 1838, when Fulton County was created. In 1842, the size of the town was increased by the annexation of land from the towns of Broadalbin and Mayfield.

Notable people
 Robert P. Aitken (1819–1873), Michigan State Representative and Civil War veteran.
 Mike Tyson, boxer, was a one-time resident of the Tryon School for Boys in the town.

Geography

Perth is east of Johnstown, the Fulton County seat. The eastern town line is the border of Saratoga County, and the southern town line is the border of Montgomery County.

New York State Route 30 is a north-south highway which passes through Perth.

Demographics

As of the census of 2000, there were 3,638 people, 1,318 households, and 951 families residing in the town.  The population density was 139.6 people per square mile (53.9/km2).  There were 1,416 housing units at an average density of 54.3 per square mile (21.0/km2).  The racial makeup of the town was 91.51% White, 6.40% African American, 0.22% Native American, 0.36% Asian, 0.58% from other races, and 0.93% from two or more races. Hispanic or Latino of any race were 3.52% of the population.

There were 1,318 households, out of which 30.4% had children under the age of 18 living with them, 57.2% were married couples living together, 9.9% had a female householder with no husband present, and 27.8% were non-families. 23.4% of all households were made up of individuals, and 9.0% had someone living alone who was 65 years of age or older.  The average household size was 2.49 and the average family size was 2.90.

In the town, the population was spread out, with 31.0% under the age of 18, 5.4% from 18 to 24, 26.4% from 25 to 44, 24.4% from 45 to 64, and 12.8% who were 65 years of age or older.  The median age was 37 years. For every 100 females, there were 107.5 males.  For every 100 females age 18 and over, there were 95.6 males.

The median income for a household in the town was $39,932, and the median income for a family was $46,181. Males had a median income of $30,032 versus $23,750 for females. The per capita income for the town was $16,870.  About 5.9% of families and 6.1% of the population were below the poverty line, including 5.0% of those under age 18 and 4.1% of those age 65 or over.

Communities and locations in Perth 
 Beyers Corners – A hamlet in the eastern part of Perth on County Road 132.
 Chuctenunda Creek – A stream flowing through the southeastern section  of Perth to Amsterdam.
 Perth (formerly "Perth Center") – The hamlet of Perth is in the north-central part of the town on NY-30.
 Stairs Corners – A hamlet in the eastern part of the town on County Road 126.
 West Galway – A hamlet by the eastern town line. This part of Perth was settled circa 1774.
 West Perth – A hamlet by the western town boundary  on County Road 107.

References

External links
 Town of Perth official website

Towns in Fulton County, New York